Firedrake may refer to:

Ships 
 , an Acheron-class destroyer launched in 1912 and sold in 1921
 , an F-class destroyer launched in 1934 and sunk in 1942
 , a Mount Hood-class ammunition ship launched in 1944 and decommissioned in 1971

Arts and entertainment 
 Firedrake, a character in the comic book series Miracleman
 Firedrake, a character in the 1997 children's novel Dragon Rider
 Firedrake (Dungeons & Dragons), a role playing game monster
 The Firedrake, a 1965 historical novel by Cecelia Holland

Other users 
 Firedrake (mythology), a dragon or similar creature in Teutonic mythology
 Firedrake Lake, a lake in the Northwest Territories, Canada
 The Firedrake, a shortwave radio jammer in China